Salto di Quirra is a restricted weapons testing range and rocket launching site near Perdasdefogu on Sardinia. 
It is the largest military range in Italy, composed of 12000 hectares of land owned by the Italian Ministry of Defence and one of the largest in operation within the European Union. Birth defects and cancer in the area have been blamed on weaponry used at the site.

Sardinia hosts about 60% of Italian military ranges and together with Friuli-Venezia Giulia is one of the most militarized regions of Italy.

Salto di Quirra primarily launches military rockets, but civilian rockets, such as the Skylark, have occasionally been launched for the study of the upper atmosphere.

The Salto di Quirra range is located close to the town of Perdasdefogu in a mountainous zone at the south-east of Sardinia. It is an inter-arm range, currently placed under the authority of the Italian Air Force. Its main activity deals with the tests of various types of missiles used or built by Italy, or in collaboration.

This base was used, at the beginning of the 1960s, for the first sounding rockets launches carried out by the CRA (Centro Ricerche Aerospaziali) in co-operation with the Italian Air Force and NASA. Three campaigns of Nike Asp and Nike Cajun launches took place, in 1961 and 1963.

From 1964 and until 1972, it was used for the ESRO sounding rockets program using especially Skylark and Centaure rockets, but also Belier and Zenit During this period, some sounding rockets were also launched on behalf of Switzerland and Germany.

After 1972, the Salto di Quirra activities in the field of rocketry were limited to national programs. Three Alfa experimental vehicles were launched successfully in 1973-75. A test of San Marco Scout rocket, in 1992, was less successful.

Vega test firings

Zefiro 9 

Two test firings of the Zefiro 9 rocket engine, designed to power the third stage of the Vega launch vehicle, have been conducted at Salto di Quirra. The first test firing took place 20 December 2005 and was a complete success. The second firing, on 28 March 2007, experienced unexpected anomalous behavior.

Space and missiles operations 
From its very first start, the Salto di Quirra (Sardinia) firing range played a relevant role in Italian space operations. The range belonged to the ITAF Ammunition Research Unit, since 1956 headed by Luigi Broglio whose name had been put forward by Gen. Mario Pezzi. In 1959, the Italian National Research Council (CNR) and ITAF started a research program in the outer atmosphere using rocket-carried probes. In 1961, together with NASA, CNR planned a series of weather experiments releasing clouds of litho-sodium carried in the atmosphere by USA-built  Nike-Cajun missiles launched from the Wallops Islands Base (Va) and Salto di Quirra (Italy) range. High altitude atmospheric streams could be measured quite accurately observing contemporarily the litho-sodium clouds from seven ground-stations in Italy (five in Sardinia and one each at Furbara base and Borgo Piave observation post).

The first launch of the series took place on January 12, 1961. A two-stage Nike-Cajun missile released 20 kg of sodium and lithium dust at an altitude of 90 km (270 000 ft). Six launches altogether were accomplished successfully. Broglio and his team set even a record, a triple launch within 24 hours, starting on the morning of January 19 and ending up the evening of the day after. Thanks to media reporting, the world at large was informed of Italian space research activities and that it was operating a missile launching pad. After this exploit, the Salto di Quirra base was involved in many research programs particularly in the European Space Research Organization (ESRO) framework. In 1962 ESRO planned a series of eight launches to study the outer atmosphere and the ionosphere. These experiments were to be fundamental to build the European Space Agency in the following years: British-built Skylark and French-built Centaure missiles were used for the tests. The high level of both personnel and facilities at Salto di Quirra made it the favourite launching base of ESRO until 1972, following an agreement signed in Paris in 1967 by ESRO's CEO, Pierre Auger. In 1985 the Avio Company built a vertical structure in Salto di Quirra to test the engines of the European vectors Ariane 3 and Ariane 4 and the Zefiro vector, from its prototype Zefiro 16 to Zefiro 9 down to number 23 in the series. At Salto di Quirra the second and third stages of Vega were tested thoroughly, the Vega being a new European vector developed and built mostly by Italian firms.

Birth defects and cancer 

Local citizens have coined the term 'Quirra syndrome' for an increase in deformities and cancer in the area. In one town, a quarter of children born in a single year in the late 1980s had birth defects. Researchers discovered that almost two-thirds of local shepherds had cancer, which has been blamed on thorium dust and depleted uranium. Former commanders of the site have since been made to appear before the Italian courts.

References

External links
ENVIRONMENTAL POLLUTION AND HEALTH EFFECTS IN THE QUIRRA AREA, SARDINIA ISLAND (ITALY) AND THE DEPLETED URANIUM CASE, Massimo Zucchetti
http://www.libreidee.org/en/tag/sindrome-di-quirra/|the Italian Chernobyl
https://www.youtube.com/watch?v=BzeMPuGBjYE Italian documentary
https://web.archive.org/web/20050204162254/http://www.univ-perp.fr/fuseurop/salto_e.htm
https://web.archive.org/web/20050416041249/http://www.astronautix.com/sites/saluirra.htm
Satellite picture

Geography of Sardinia
Rocket launch sites
Buildings and structures in Sardinia
Spaceports in Europe